Harrison Gray Otis (October 8, 1765October 28, 1848), was a businessman, lawyer, and politician, becoming one of the most important leaders of the United States' first political party, the Federalists. He was a member of the Otis family.

One of the wealthiest men of Boston, Otis was reportedly worth at least US$800,000 in 1846,  .

Early life 
Otis was born in Boston, Massachusetts on October 8, 1765 to Elizabeth (née Gray) and Samuel Allyne Otis. His uncle was American colonial  leader and activist James Otis, and his father was active in early American politics as a member of Massachusetts state house of representatives, delegate to Massachusetts state constitutional convention, and Continental Congress delegate from Massachusetts. His aunt was Mercy Otis Warren, a well-known poet.

Otis himself graduated from Boston Latin School in 1773 and Harvard University in 1783, studied law, and was admitted to the bar in 1786 when he commenced practice in Boston.

Career
In 1794 he was elected to the Massachusetts legislature, and in 1796 was appointed by President George Washington to be U.S. Attorney for Massachusetts. In 1797, he was elected U.S. Representative from Massachusetts as a Federalist and a strong advocate for centralized government, in which office he served until 1801. He was appointed United States U.S. Attorney for Massachusetts by President John Adams (1801–1802), and again served in the state legislature from 1802 to 1817, serving several terms as President of the state senate (1805–1806, 1808–1811). He was elected a Fellow of the American Academy of Arts and Sciences in 1804.  In subsequent years, Otis was elected U.S. Senator from Massachusetts (1817–1822), and then Mayor of Boston (1829–1831).

Judicial career
In 1814, in the midst of his political career, he was also named a judge of the court of common pleas (1814–1818), and played a leading role as delegate to the controversial Hartford Convention in which New England's secession from the United States was discussed. Overall, it led to the demise of the Federalists, and Otis's political ambitions suffered. Otis subsequently defended the convention in his Letters Developing the Character and Views of the Hartford Convention (1820) and his Letters in Defence of the Hartford Convention (1824).

Otis was involved in a major financial scandal during the site selection for the Massachusetts State House.  Boston was determined to remain the state capitol, and appointed Otis to a town committee to purchase land and donate it to the state.  He did so, and also quietly arranged his own private purchase of  adjoining from the agent of John Singleton Copley, then living in England.  After a decade of legal arguments, the sale was upheld, and Otis and the Mount Vernon Proprietors developed a large part of Beacon Hill.

Otis was an overseer of Harvard University from 1810 to 1823, and a fellow of the university from 1823 to 1825, as well as one of the original incorporators of the Boston Bank.  In 1812, Otis also became a founding member of the American Antiquarian Society.

Personal life

On May 31, 1790, Otis married Sally Foster, the daughter of prominent merchant William Foster.  During the course of his lifetime, he built not one, but three, grand houses in quick succession (see Harrison Gray Otis House), all designed by noted architect Charles Bulfinch.  Together, Harrison and Sally were the parents of eleven children, including:

 Elizabeth Gray Otis (1791–1824), who married George Williams Lyman (1786–1880), a director of the Boston and Lowell Railroad.
 Harrison Gray Otis, Jr. (1792–1827), who married Eliza Henderson Boardman (1796–1873).
 Sally Ann Otis (1793–1819), who married Israel Thorndike, Jr. (1785–1867), son of merchant Israel Thorndike.
 Sophia Harrison Otis (1799–1874), who married Andrew Ritchie Jr. (1782–1862).
 James William Otis (1800–1869), who married Martha C. Church (1807–1888) in 1825.
 William Foster Otis (1801–1858), who married Emily Marshall (1807–1836).

He died in Boston on October 28, 1848, and is buried in Mount Auburn Cemetery, Cambridge, Massachusetts.

Descendants
Through his son William, he was the grandfather of Emily Marshall Otis (1832–1906), who married historian and educator Samuel Eliot.  Through his son James, he was the grandfather of James Otis, a New York State Senator and society leader.

A descendant was J. Wadsworth Ritchie (1861–1924), son of Montgomery Harrison Ritchie, who died in the American Civil War, and the first husband of Cornelia Wadsworth Ritchie Adair.

Gallery

See also
 Harrison Gray Otis House
 Timeline of Boston, 1790s-1830s

References

External links

1765 births
1848 deaths
People from colonial Boston
Federalist Party United States senators
Fellows of the American Academy of Arts and Sciences
Harvard University alumni
Massachusetts state senators
Presidents of the Massachusetts Senate
Mayors of Boston
Members of the American Antiquarian Society
Otis family
United States Attorneys for the District of Massachusetts
United States senators from Massachusetts
Burials at Mount Auburn Cemetery
Federalist Party members of the United States House of Representatives from Massachusetts